Yogi Triana (born 5 July 1994) is an Indonesian professional footballer who plays as a goalkeeper for Liga 2 club Bekasi City.

Club career

Persita Tangerang
In 2013, Yogi signed a year contract with Persita Tangerang to play in the Indonesia Super League. He made his league debut on 31 January 2013 by starting in a 4–0 loss against Persidafon Dafonsoro.

Sriwijaya FC
On November 12, 2014, he moved to Sriwijaya.

Return to Persita Tangerang 
In 2017, Yogi decided to re-join former club Persita Tangerang, signing a one-year contract with Persita from Sriwijaya to play in Liga 2.

Perserang Serang
On 18 June 2021, Yogi joined Perserang Serang from Persita Tangerang to play in 2021-22 Liga 2, he was contracted for one year with his friend while still in Persita, Egi Melgiansyah, Rio Ramandika and Henry Rivaldi. He made his league debut on 27 September by starting in a 2–1 win against PSKC Cimahi.

Honours

Club
Persita Tangerang
 Liga 2 runner-up: 2019

References

External links 
 
 Yogi Triana at Liga Indonesia

1994 births
Living people
Indonesian footballers
Liga 1 (Indonesia) players
Persita Tangerang players
Sriwijaya F.C. players
Association football goalkeepers
People from Bogor
Sportspeople from West Java